Rafaella Cribiore (born 1948) is professor of Classics at New York University. She specialises in papyrology, ancient education, ancient Greek rhetoric and the Second Sophistic.

Education
Cribiore received her PhD from the Department of Classics at Columbia University in 1993. Her doctoral thesis was entitled Writing, Teachers and Students in Graeco-Roman Egypt. She received her BA from Università Cattolica del Sacro Cuore in 1972.

Career
Cribiore was Curator of Papyri, Rare Book and Manuscripts Library at Columbia University. She has been Professor at New York University since 2008. Cribiore has written extensively on ancient literacy and education, ancient Egypt and papyrology, and late antique rhetoric. Cribiore's work, Gymnastics of the Mind: Greek Education in Hellenistic and Roman Egypt (Princeton, 2001) won the Charles Goodwin Award in 2004.

Selected publications
 Writing, Teachers, and Students in Graeco-Roman Egypt (Atlanta, 1996)
 Gymnastics of the Mind: Greek Education in Hellenistic and Roman Egypt (Princeton: Princeton University Press, 2001)
 (with Roger Bagnall) Women’s Letters from Ancient Egypt 300 BC-AD 800 (Michigan: Ann Arbor, 2006)
 The School of Libanius in Late Antique Antioch (Princeton: Princeton University Press, 2007)
 Martina’s Town (New York: Legas Press, 2010)
 Libanius the Sophist: Rhetoric, Reality and Religion in the Fourth Century (Ithaca: Cornell University Press, 2013) 
 (with Roger S. Bagnall, Nicola Aravecchia, Paola Davoli, Olaf E. Kaper, and Susanna McFadden) An Oasis City (New York: New York University Press, 2015)
 Between City and School: Selected Orations of Libanius (Liverpool: Liverpool University Press, 2016)

References

External links
A Lesson In Greek from Ancient Egypt (Think Tech On OC16)

Living people
Columbia Graduate School of Arts and Sciences alumni
Università Cattolica del Sacro Cuore alumni
New York University faculty
Women classical scholars
Italian classical scholars
1948 births